Dow Peak is a peak located 2 nautical miles (4 km) east-southeast of Mount Sturm in the Bowers Mountains, a major mountain range of Victoria Land, Antarctica. The topographical feature was so named by the New Zealand Geological Survey Antarctic Expedition to northern Victoria Land, 1967–68, for its senior geologist, J.A.S. Dow. The peak lies situated on the Pennell Coast, a portion of Antarctica lying between Cape Williams and Cape Adare.

References 

Mountains of Victoria Land
Pennell Coast